Norwood is a suburb of Cape Town, in the Western Cape province of South Africa.

References

Suburbs of Cape Town